Thomas Francis Williams (7 April 1897 – 1992) was an Australian politician.

Born in Young, New South Wales, Williams was educated at Catholic schools and then the University of Sydney, becoming a barrister in 1923.

In 1943 Williams gained Australian Labor Party (ALP) pre-selection for the Australian House of Representatives electorate of Robertson and defeated sitting United Australia Party (UAP) member Eric Spooner at the 1943 federal election.

Following the death in office of Prime Minister John Curtin on 5 July 1945, Williams urged that the caucus leadership ballot should be deferred until the return of H.V. Evatt from overseas, whom Williams described as "the biggest man in political life in Australia". Instead, the caucus elected Ben Chifley as leader of the ALP parliamentary leader (and thus Prime Minister).

Williams held the seat of Robertson until the 1949 federal election, when he was defeated by Liberal Party of Australia candidate Roger Dean. Williams returned to law and died in 1992.

Sources
 Abjorensen, N. (2016) The Manner of Their Going, Australian Scholarly Publishing: Kew. .

References

Australian Labor Party members of the Parliament of Australia
Members of the Australian House of Representatives for Robertson
Members of the Australian House of Representatives
1897 births
1992 deaths
20th-century Australian politicians
People from Young, New South Wales